AKM Moinul Haque is a politician from Jamalpur District of Bangladesh. He was elected a member of parliament from Jamalpur-1 in February 1996.

Career 
AKM Moinul Haque was elected a Member of Parliament from Jamalpur-1 constituency as an Bangladesh Nationalist Party in the February 1996 Bangladeshi general election. He was defeated by Jamalpur-1 constituency as a candidate of Bangladesh Nationalist Party in the 7th parliamentary elections on 12 June 1996.

References 

Living people
Year of birth missing (living people)
People from Jamalpur District
Bangladesh Nationalist Party politicians
6th Jatiya Sangsad members